The Finnish Synchronized Skating Championships is an annual synchronized skating competition, sanctioned by the Finnish Figure Skating Association, held to determine the national champions of Finland. It was first held in 1991. The teams compete at novice, junior and senior levels. At the senior level, the teams qualifying for the World Championships (WSSC) have been selected based on their performance at two qualifiers held before the championships and the national championships. For example, in the 2012–13 season, the teams were selected as follows: the Finnish Champion qualified automatically as Team Finland 1 for the WSSC. Team Finland 2 at the WSSC was the team which earned the fewest points from the first qualifier, the second qualifier and the Finnish Championships. The points equaled the sum of the positions at the three competitions with growing coefficients: the coefficient was 0,3 for the first competition result, 0,5 for the second and 1 for the last. Also the teams for World Junior Championships (and for the Junior World Challenge Cup) are selected based on their performance at the national competitions. For example, in the 2012–13 season, the junior teams were selected as follows: both Team Finland 1 and 2 at the WJSSC were the teams which earned the fewest points from the first qualifier and the second qualifier. The points equaled the sum of the positions at the three competitions with growing coefficients: the coefficient was 0,4 for the first competition result and 0,6 for the second.

Medalists

Senior teams

Junior teams

Novice teams

References

Finland
Figure skating in Finland
Synchronized skating
nat Finland